Russell Bernard Thomson (born 16 August 1969) is a South Africa former first-class cricketer.

Thomson was born at Johannesburg in August 1969. He later studied in England at Keble College at the University of Oxford. While studying at Oxford, he played first-class cricket for Oxford University in 1996, making ten appearances, which included playing in that years University Match against Cambridge at Lord's. A right-arm medium pace, Thomson took 9 wickets in his ten matches an average of 58.55, with best figures of 2 for 24.

References

External links

1969 births
Living people
Sportspeople from Johannesburg
Alumni of Keble College, Oxford
South African cricketers
Oxford University cricketers